Ben Eltham is an Australian writer, journalist, researcher, creative producer and social commentator based in Melbourne.

He is a lecturer in media and communications at Monash University's School of Media, Film and Journalism and was a fellow of the Centre for Policy Development and a research fellow at Deakin University's Centre for Memory, Imagination and Invention. Eltham studied neuroscience and philosophy at the University of Queensland, and did a PhD at Western Sydney University on cultural policy. He has served as national affairs correspondent for New Matilda.

Contributions
 Public policy of culture in Australia, particularly at federal level. 
 When the Goal Posts Move: Patronage, power and resistance in Australian cultural policy 2013–2016 (Currency House, 2016). 
 Popular media; journalist and essayist with New Matilda, contributor to Crikey, Guardian Australia, Overland, Meanjin and the Sydney Review of Books. 
 Producer and festival director in Newcastle, Brisbane and Melbourne.

Bibliography
Listing

Plays

Book reviews

References

Australian essayists
Australian male dramatists and playwrights
Australian people of English descent
Australian philosophers
Australian social commentators
Film theorists
Literary theorists
Living people
Mass media theorists
Philosophers of art
Philosophers of culture
Philosophers of literature
Philosophers of social science
Social philosophers
University of Queensland alumni
Western Sydney University alumni
Year of birth missing (living people)